Ribautia is a genus of centipedes in the family Geophilidae. It was described by French myriapodologist Henry Wilfred Brolemann in 1909. Centipedes in this genus are found in South America, tropical Africa, Madagascar, the Arabian penninsula, Australia, New Zealand, and Melanesia.

Description
Centipedes in this genus range from 1 cm to 7 cm in length and can have as few as 31 or as many as 125 pairs of legs. Males of the species Ribautia taeniata have 105 to 121 leg pairs, while females of that species have 111 to 125 leg pairs, which is the maximum number found in this genus.

Species
There are over 50 valid species, including:
 Ribautia aggregata (Brölemann, 1915)
 Ribautia conifera (Attems, 1911)
 Ribautia derrana (Chamberlin, 1920)
 Ribautia dietrichiae (Verhoeff, 1925)
 Ribautia imparata (Attems, 1911)
 Ribautia mjoebergi (Verhoeff, 1925)
 Ribautia rainbowi (Brölemann, 1912)
 Ribautia repanda (Attems, 1911)
 Ribautia wheeleri (Chamberlin, 1920)

References

 

 
 
Centipede genera
Animals described in 1909
Taxa named by Henry Wilfred Brolemann